Loire Forez Agglomération is the communauté d'agglomération, an intercommunal structure, centred on the city of Montbrison. It is located in the Loire department, in the Auvergne-Rhône-Alpes region, southeastern France. It was created in January 2017 by the merger of the former communauté d'agglomération de Loire Forez and three communautés de communes. Its area is 1321.0 km2. Its population was 110,772 in 2019, of which 15,915 in Montbrison.

Composition 
The Loire Forez Agglomération consists of the following 87 communes:

Ailleux
Apinac
Arthun
Bard, Loire
Boën-sur-Lignon
Boisset-lès-Montrond
Boisset-Saint-Priest
Bonson, Loire
Bussy-Albieux
Cervières, Loire
Cezay
Chalain-d'Uzore
Chalain-le-Comtal
Chalmazel-Jeansagnière
La Chamba
Chambles
La Chambonie
Champdieu
La Chapelle-en-Lafaye
Châtelneuf, Loire
Chazelles-sur-Lavieu
Chenereilles, Loire
La Côte-en-Couzan
Craintilleux
Débats-Rivière-d'Orpra
Écotay-l'Olme
Essertines-en-Châtelneuf
Estivareilles, Loire
Grézieux-le-Fromental
Gumières
L'Hôpital-le-Grand
L'Hôpital-sous-Rochefort
Lavieu
Leigneux
Lérigneux
Lézigneux
Luriecq
Magneux-Haute-Rive
Marcilly-le-Châtel
Marcoux, Loire
Margerie-Chantagret
Marols, Loire
Merle-Leignec
Montarcher
Montbrison, Loire
Montverdun
Mornand-en-Forez
Noirétable
Palogneux
Périgneux
Pralong
Précieux
Roche, Loire
Sail-sous-Couzan
Sainte-Agathe-la-Bouteresse
Saint-Bonnet-le-Château
Saint-Bonnet-le-Courreau
Saint-Cyprien, Loire
Saint-Didier-sur-Rochefort
Saint-Étienne-le-Molard
Sainte-Foy-Saint-Sulpice
Saint-Georges-en-Couzan
Saint-Georges-Haute-Ville
Saint-Hilaire-Cusson-la-Valmitte
Saint-Jean-la-Vêtre
Saint-Jean-Soleymieux
Saint-Just-en-Bas
Saint-Just-Saint-Rambert
Saint-Laurent-Rochefort
Saint-Marcellin-en-Forez
Saint-Paul-d'Uzore
Saint-Priest-la-Vêtre
Saint-Romain-le-Puy
Saint-Sixte, Loire
Saint-Thomas-la-Garde
Sauvain
Savigneux, Loire
Soleymieux
Sury-le-Comtal
La Tourette
Trelins
Unias
Usson-en-Forez
La Valla-sur-Rochefort
Veauchette
Verrières-en-Forez
Vêtre-sur-Anzon

References

External links 
 Loire Forez
 Visitor Center

Loire Forez
Loire Forez
Montbrison, Loire